The Skallagrímur men's basketball team, commonly known as Skallagrímur, is the men's basketball department of  Ungmennafélagið Skallagrímur, based in Borgarnes, Iceland.

History
In 2018, Skallagrímur was promoted to the Úrvalsdeild karla. Following the 2018-2019 season, it was relegated back to 1. deild karla.

Honours 
Division I
 Winners (4): 1973, 1991, 2004, 2018

Division II
 Winners (1): 1979

Individual awards

Úrvalsdeild Men's Foreign Player of the Year
Darrell Flake - 2008
Úrvalsdeild Men's Young Player of the Year
Hlynur Bæringsson - 1999
Úrvalsdeild Men's Coach of the Year
Tómas Holton - 1995

Úrvalsdeild Men's Domestic All-First Team
Birgir Mikaelsson - 1993
Hlynur Bæringsson - 2002

Notable players

Coaches

References

External links
KKÍ.is profile

Skallagrímur (basketball)